The Assembly Rooms Cinema Hall (also known as Assembly Rooms Theatre and Assembly Rooms Talkies) is a cinema hall in Ooty, Tamil Nadu. It is located by the Garden Road (the road joining Charring cross to the Government Botanical Gardens, Ooty). The theatre in one of the oldest in the region, being established over a century ago.

Operation
The theatre was established in 1901. The theatre is owned by the government and is run by the government under a trust. The theatre is noted to show mostly English language films. 
This theatre was shutdown in 2011 and re-opened on 26 November 2015 after renovation.

See also
 Government Rose Garden, Ooty
 Adam's fountain
 Stone House, Ooty
 Ooty Golf Course

References

Theatres in India
Buildings and structures in Ooty